The Central District of Khodabandeh County is in Zanjan province, Iran. At the National Census in 2006, its population was 84,361 in 19,207 households. The following census in 2011 counted 92,341 people in 24,997 households. At the latest census in 2016, the district had 93,005 inhabitants in 26,863 households.

References 

Khodabandeh County

Districts of Zanjan Province

Populated places in Zanjan Province

Populated places in Khodabandeh County